Pepa Randall (born 1 April 1996) is an Australian rules footballer playing for the Greater Western Sydney Giants in the AFL Women's (AFLW). 

Randall played state league football with the Eastern Devils in the VFL Women's competition.

She is the granddaughter and great-granddaughter of former Hawthorn footballers Trevor Randall and Viv Randall.

References

External links 

1996 births
Living people
Greater Western Sydney Giants (AFLW) players
Australian rules footballers from Victoria (Australia)